Palchan is a village in the Kullu district in the state of Himachal Pradesh, India. It has a population of 1,241 according to 2011 census. it is close to tourist places of Manali, Solang and Rohtang pass.

References 

Villages in Kullu district